This was the first edition of the tournament.

Julian Knowle and Igor Zelenay won the title after defeating Rameez Junaid and Kevin Krawietz 2–6, 6–2, [10–7] in the final.

Seeds

Draw

External Links
 Main Draw

Internazionali di Tennis d'Abruzzo - Doubles
Internazionali di Tennis d'Abruzzo